The Copper Canyon Fire was a wildfire that started near the town of Globe, Arizona on May 7, 2021.

Development

May 
The Copper Canyon Fire was first reported on May 7, 2021, at around 9am MST. The cause of the fire is believed to be human caused, but is still under investigation.

Containment 
As of May 24, 2021, the fire is fully contained.

Aftermath

References 

Wildfires in Arizona
2021 Arizona wildfires
2021 in Arizona
May 2021 events in the United States